Chinna Veppanatham is a village located in Namakkal district, Tamil Nadu, India. This is one of the villages under Vasanthapuram Panchayat.

Located in 

Fourth km from Namakkal to Trichy StateHighway.

Pin Code and STD Code 

Postal Services are given to this Village by the Vasanthapuram post office which is located around 2 Kilometer from here.

Pin Code : 637002 . STD Code : 04286.

How to reach 

You can get buses from Namakkal town bus stand. Bus numbers : All 24 Series, 15 Series and 3. Also Mini bus facility is available from Namakkal.

Bus Stop Name : Veppanatham Colony.

School 

The primary source of knowledge is Primary Education. Panchayat Union Middle School located at  this village is giving education to students from in and around the village. Initially this school was started as primary school. Because of the continuous effort by a teacher Haridass (He worked in this school more than 15 years) and the village people, later in 1990s it improved to Middle school having up to 8th standard. The new building required for middle school classes is built from the donation fund given by Village people.

Few of the alumni from this school are working in other cities in India and abroad. And few are doing business in the village itself and serving to the village.

Map of this school on wikimapia : http://wikimapia.org/4106085/ta/Chinna-Veppanatham-Panchayat-Union-Middle-School

Temple 

Most of the people living in this village are Hindu. In Tamil Nadu one of the famous Hindu Goddess is Amman (meaning 'mother'). People used to pray amman in different names. This village also has one of the amman temple named Bagavathiamman Temple in the center of the village.

This temple has one Vinayagar Temple and Muni. Muni is another famous God of Tamil. People pray this god because they believe he is the guard to the Village.

References

 http://pincodeaddress.com/address/Chinna-Veppanatham_Vasanthapuram

Villages in Namakkal district